Nasai is an administrative ward in Siha District of Kilimanjaro Region in Tanzania. According to the 2012 census, the ward has a total population of 8,032.

References

Wards of Siha District
Wards of Kilimanjaro Region